"Cross the Border" was the lead single released from Philly's Most Wanted's debut album, Get Down or Lay Down. The song was produced by The Neptunes.

"Cross the Border" became the duo's most successful single, reaching number 98 on the Billboard Hot 100, while gaining the most success on the Billboard Hot Rap Singles chart, peaking at number three. The song was accompanied by a music video directed by Jeremy Rall.

Single track listing

A-Side
"Cross the Border" (Album Version) - 4:25
"Cross the Border" (Clean) - 4:23
"Cross the Border" (Instrumental) - 4:25

B-Side
"Suckas, Pt.2 (For Da’ Gansta’s)" (Album Version) - 4:40
"Suckas, Pt.2 (For Da’ Gansta’s)" (Clean) - 3:56
"Suckas, Pt.2 (For Da’ Gansta’s)" (Instrumental) - 3:53

Charts

Peak positions

Year-End charts

References

2000 singles
Atlantic Records singles
Music videos directed by Jeremy Rall
Philly's Most Wanted songs
Song recordings produced by the Neptunes
2000 songs